JSW Barmer Power Station is a coal-based thermal power plant located in Bhadresh village in Barmer district, Rajasthan, India. The power plant is operated by the company JSW Energy Limited.

The coal for the plant is sourced from Kapurdi and Jalipa mines. Water for the power plant is sourced from Indira Gandhi Canal by constructing a 185 km pipeline.

Capacity
Is has an installed capacity of 1080 MW (8x135 MW). The plant became fully operational in 2013.

References

External links

 JSW Barmer (Jalipa Kapurdi) power station at SourceWatch

Coal-fired power stations in Rajasthan
Barmer, Rajasthan
JSW Energy
2009 establishments in Rajasthan
Energy infrastructure completed in 2009